This a list of fictional characters in the television series, Big Time Rush. The article deals with main, recurring, minor character and notable guest stars.

Main characters

Kendall Knight 
Kendall Knight (Kendall Schmidt) is the leader and founder of Big Time Rush (despite being the youngest) when he accepts to move to Los Angeles and record demos only if Gustavo brings James, Carlos, and Logan along to make them all a band. He is portrayed as the glue that keeps the band together. He manages to stay cool under pressure (described as "Cool Rush") and figure out solutions to problems, thus often resulting in the other guys running to Kendall when they have a problem, being the most mature and responsible member of Big Time Rush. Kendall keeps a great relationship with his mother and his younger sister, Katie, who helps him and his friends whenever they get into trouble. He is quite affectionate towards Katie, as she is always there to help him and vice versa. Kendall's mother is the only parent shown on a regular basis while his father is not mentioned.  Kendall is of Serbian origins as discussed on Big Time Double Date.

Kendall has a crush on Jo from the very beginning she came to L.A. and by insisting on Jo to give him a chance they soon after become a couple. They keep the longest relationship on the series until Jo accepts a three-year movie deal to New Zealand and moves there (thus breaking up with Kendall). Kendall goes into heartbreak after Jo leaves. However, with his friends' help, he is able to get back on his feet. Kendall is the only one who never caught "Hollywood Fever", which turned out to be a subconscious manifestation of homesickness, because he never lost touch with the life and hobbies he had in Minnesota. Although he takes his work seriously, Kendall loves to joke around and is usually hyper. He tends to stand up for himself and likes to talk back and be sarcastic. He is kind, helpful and always there for his friends and also he is shown to be good at maintaining relationships, as he shares great friendships with the boys, his sister and his mother. In the season 2 finale "Big Time Move" while he was singing Lucy winked at him and he seemed to be slightly shocked. In season 3 "Big Time Returns", Kendall had to run around the Palm Woods in his underwear because he talked to Lucy when James called dibs on her. In "Bel Air Rush", Kendall and all the guys move to Bel Air but want to escape. So Kendall and Logan find a way to escape back to L.A. In Big Time Double Date Kendall helps Lucy lie to her parents about Lucy being on a violin scholarship. But in the end Lucy's mom and dad find out the truth so Kendall decides that he, James, Carlos, Logan and Lucy should play the song Cover Girl. While dining with all the guys Lucy holds Kendall's hand which Kendall doesn't mind. It seems Kendall might have feelings for Lucy. In Big Time Merchandise Kendall, and the others, wanted to sell their own better merchandise for Selmart. In Big Time Surprise he and Lucy share their first kiss but are interrupted by Jo who has come back to the Palm Woods, forcing him to decide between the two. In the end, he chose Jo. Lucy eventually decides to leave, but returns in Season 4 after releasing a hit album and things onward are very awkward but they managed to stay on good terms throughout the rest of the series after Lucy decided not to exposed Kendall as a jerk on television.

James Diamond 
 James Diamond (James Maslow) is the pretty boy of Big Time Rush. He is the one who originally wanted to be a star when the boys were just four hockey players in Minnesota. James is shallow, driven, sometimes an airhead, and, like Logan, sometimes panics under pressure, but is a good friend, and he always looks out for his bandmates. He is the second-to-youngest member of the group before Kendall. James loves wearing bandanas and has an alter-ego known as Bandana-Man, which is just him wrapped in purple bandanas. James always has personal head shots of himself which he carries along, wherever he goes. Of his bandmates, he is closest to Carlos, whom he loves to play video games and goof around with. He is described as solid-voiced and driven beyond belief. Though he is conceited, James can also be caring and think of others. He is shown as a ladies' man, usually dating one girl or the other. He is very muscular. According to Carlos, he always gets the girls and declares himself the "pretty one". He accidentally shared a kiss with Camille while practicing a romantic play, but still remained good friends. He supports the band as best as he can and loves having fun. He is also shown to be overprotective of Katie, revealing that he sees her as a little sister. His mother, Brooke (played by soap opera veteran Lisa Rinna), is considered the "Estee Lauder of the Midwest" for her successful cosmetics line. She wanted to take James to be the CEO of her cosmetic line but the boys and their moms found a way for James to be kept in L.A. It is revealed though that he has trouble saying no to her and is a Mama's boy. His parents are divorced and apparently his dad is remarried to some woman that is fifteen years younger than he is, so his parents don't talk. However, James' dad was revealed in Big Time Concert, and had a small speaking role. Though his name wasn't revealed, one could tell it was James' dad by the way he dressed and acted. In "Big Time Interview", it is revealed that James started singing and dancing at age two and starting using hair care products at age three. It is also revealed in Big Time Movie that James is afraid of heights. In season 3 Big Time Returns James called dibs on Lucy Stone and kept pestering her. When he asked her out Lucy said she just wanted to be friends which meant no. In Bel Air Rush James wanted to escape from Bel Air back to L.A. like everyone else. In Big Time Double Date James wanted Carlos' date with a Jennifer to go perfect so he dressed as a waiter at the fancy restaurant Carlos and Jennifer were dining in. In Big Time Merchandise James and Logan made Big Time Rush perfume for Sam Selmart. He went from having long hair (Season 1) to having medium-length hair (Season 2), short hair (Season 3) and really short hair without a fringe (Season 4). In Big Time Dreams he finally gets to kiss Lucy, which leads them to start dating at the end.

Carlos Garcia 
Carlos Garcia (Carlos Pena Jr.) is the joker of the band who likes to wear his hockey helmet for no apparent reason. According to Kendall, he isn't very tough without it. Carlos is the oldest member of the band. He is also the shortest and most immature of the group. He is shown to be friendly, optimistic, childish, energetic, impulsive, dimwitted, unpredictable, naïve and reckless. Because of his childish nature, he almost always tends to rebound quickly from setbacks, with his sudden break up in Big Time Single and James revealing his betrayal of throwing away Heather Fox's note saying she liked Carlos in Big Time Secret being rare exceptions. He is also very superstitious, believing in ghosts and the paranormal, as well as being cautious of bringers of bad luck like black cats and broken mirrors. He is easygoing and very persuadable, which often gets him into trouble. He can get really sensitive, he is extremely prone to accidents (possible reason for the helmet), he acts impulsively and therefore casually says whatever he has on mind no matter what. However, Carlos never intends to be insensitive or hurtful when he does this. Moreover, he is always the last to figure out what is going on or what the guys plan. Carlos usually suggests thinking "happy thoughts about kittens" when his bandmates get into arguments. He sometimes has little disputes with Logan, but it's clear they're very close as they get paired up together often. He also constantly gets into fights with James, but they usually blow over pretty fast, with their fight over Heather Fox in Big Time Secret being the rare exception. In Big Time Audition, it was said that Carlos lost his pet, Sparky, when he was little. A running gag is that Carlos usually almost gets the guys caught or in trouble and he says the wrong things at the wrong time and is the least sophisticated non down to earth guy in BTR. However, he's also the nicest, as mentioned by Katie, Camille and Mrs. Knight. In "Big Time Interview", it is shown that Carlos' dad is from Minneapolis. It also says that he is nicknamed "The Wild Rush" and he was voted "most likely to marry a corndog" by his sophomore class due to his strong liking to corn dogs. According to Kendall, Carlos once beat up the entire eighth grade in middle school.

Carlos likes most girls he sees, because he never had a "real" girlfriend and has been shown to be very awkward and silly in front of girls he finds attractive. He has though a big special crush on Jennifers throughout the series, even though they keep rejecting him and did, however, have a date with Jennifer 1 for the prom Big Time Prom Kings whereas Jennifer 3 gave him a flirty wave while he was singing in season two finale Big Time Move probably hinting that she likes him. In Big Time Double Date, he goes on a date with her, albeit with James helping him. He also has dated Jennifer 2 in Big Time Rescue after saving her from the studio's guard. He also had a short relationship with Sasha, a girl Gustavo hired to date him and a visit from his long ago big time crush, Heather Fox who once seemed to like him, but fails to win her back. The closest thing he's had to a real potential girlfriend is filmmaker, Stephanie King, who appeared in two episodes of Season 1 (Big Time Terror and Big Time Dance). Eventually though Carlos finally got a girlfriend in the series finale where he started dating Alexa Vega. In Big Time Break-Up, Carlos reveals that he has a metal plate in his head that acts as a counter-vailents against electrical currents.

Logan Mitchell 
Hortense “Logan” Mitchell (Logan Henderson) is the genius and second-in-command of the group. He is genuine and sweet, and the next most down-to-earth guy in the band after Kendall. He is also the serious one but usually follows along in his friend's schemes, sometimes making schemes of his own when needed, like his most famous scheme, 'Love Science'. He is the second oldest of the group after Carlos. Logan is extremely smart and the other guys usually rely on him to solve certain problems, like school work and such. However, he panics under pressure usually leaving it to Kendall to come up with answer. Logan is introduced in Big Time Audition as the brain of the group. He has his learners' permit and drives the others to the audition, and later, to places around the Palm Woods. Logan can be shy but when he lets loose, he can be just as goofy as his friends. Logan states that if he wasn't in a band, he'd be studying to be a doctor. He is stubborn but also sensitive, described as the weakest in the band and a really good friend. He is very hard-working and as Kelly says he has an adorable smile. Logan's favorite mathematician is Phoebe Nachee, a woman, who as he later realizes much to his shock, hates boys. Logan is also skeptical of ghosts and the paranormal, relying on science for logical explanations of unnatural things. He has a grandma who is sometimes mentioned. It is revealed later in the series that he is indecisive and has a weak bladder. It's also revealed that his given name is Hortense, but James's mother hated the name and told the boys to call him Logan, and since no one ever says no to James' mom the name stuck, much to his liking. It is implied that he is a bit self-conscious about hugging and kissing his mother in front of his friends. However, he cares about her. In Big Time Interview it is revealed that Logan moved to Minnesota in third grade and immediately became friends with the other boys because he did their homework for them. It is unknown where he came from, though.

Logan is shown to have feelings for Camille right from the beginning and later on they become a couple until "Big Time Girlfriends" where James being his best friend and Camille being his girlfriend kiss.  The two decide to remain friends. However, they still keep an unresolved on again off again relationship. It is stated that he has never asked anyone out before Camille, though having some dates in the past. Despite their "break-up" Logan and Camille still remained friends and also seem to have feelings for each other, as proven in Big Time Secret where he gets extremely jealous when she starts spending time with Kendall secretly. Later, in Big Time Move they are seen in flirty interaction during a performance, in Big Time Returns get together again and decides to have a real relationship. Camille is the only girl that Logan has kissed in the show similar to Kendall and Jo.

Katie Knight 
Katie Knight (Ciara Bravo) is Kendall's little sister who is shown to be a lot smarter and quick-witted than her mother. She enjoys blackmailing and likes to gamble. She goes to the Palm Woods School with the boys, after starring in a commercial where all she had to do was beat up a boy. She is originally nine years old in the pilot, later turns 10 in early Season 1 in the series, and later turns 11 in early-Season 2 in the series. She is very clever and has excellent business senses, which is why the boys often need her for their plans. She is a good sister to Kendall and the boys, helping them out whenever needed. It is shown that the other boys in the band look at Katie as their own little sister too. And the other boys are also shown to be protective of her. Kendall frequently calls her "baby sister" and she calls him "big brother" especially when they are plotting something. Though it is stated in various episodes that she lacks friends, she seems to be friends with Tyler. She is wise and has great ideas. She can often be manipulative but has a good heart. It is also suspected that Katie has a minor crush on James, but does her best to deny it. Katie has a "frenemies" relationship with Mr. Bitters. Kendall said that he convinced their mother not to name Katie "Apple". She helps Kendall through his heartbreak and comforts him.

Such as seen in Big Time Break-Up when Jo leaves for three years she tries to cheer him up. Throughout the series it is shown that she can be quite devious and often does things for money. She loves her brother and he is very protective of her. She has helped out Kendall multiple times as well as James, Carlos, and Logan. She is also shown to have a friendship with Gustavo and Kelly helping them out numerous times. EX: Helping Gustavo figure out what a song means, helping him with his writer's block, and helping him find out her mom's secret family Snickerdoodle recipe (because it helped him write a better song and he could not stop thinking about them, but mainly because Kelly promised to give her a hundred dollars).

Gustavo Rocque 
Gustavo Kramer Rocque (Stephen Kramer Glickman) is a world-renowned but hot tempered record producer who auditions the boys in Minnesota and brings them to L.A. to make them stars. He is the founder and head of Rocque Records, a division of RCMCBT Global Net Sanyoid CorporationBefore Big Time Rush, he had twenty-nine platinum albums, including ones he made with a previous boy band, "Boy Quake". He's cliche and always has a frown on his face while the boys are performing, even when he likes the song. He has also been the butt of several fat jokes. At first he couldn't stand James, stating that he reminds him of Matthew McConaughey, whom he hates. However, this changed as the series went on. He admits to liking the boys after dealing with an absolutely perfect boy band that he hated because they were so perfect. He affectionately refers to the boys as his "dogs" because of an encounter in "big time audition". His mansion has a fridge filled with pudding. He has little patience for things. He does not eat pulled pork. So far Gustavo has landed a record deal, produced an album, recorded with Jordin Sparks and beat his all-time nemesis Hawk, finally forcing him to admit to Kelly that the boys are his good luck charms. Gustavo is an excellent piano player. Kelly reveals to the guys that Gustavo didn't have a normal childhood, having been forced by his mother to spend all of his time playing piano and never being allowed to play like normal kids. Gustavo reveals that he has been banned from all hotels in Los Angeles, along with Russell Crowe, Aerosmith, and the "original host of Blue's Clues" (Steven Burns). He often acts annoyed by the boys, however, it is implied that he considers them part of his family. In Big Time Camping the boys want to camp out but Gustavo gets worried about their safety.

Kelly Wainwright 
Kelly Wainwright (Tanya Chisholm) is a talent scout and Gustavo's assistant. Her personality is a lot mellower than her boss's. She is honest, polite, and very efficient. She is usually the straight woman and the only ones looking out for the band. She is also very helpful and supportive. She serves mainly as moderator/mediator between Gustavo and Big Time Rush, keeping Gustavo's rage in check and simultaneously getting the boys to do what they have to do, avoiding the clashes that would otherwise ensue. She is very organized. As stated by Gustavo and everyone else, she is a horrible "faker-liar-actress". She is usually always with Gustavo and seems to know him better than anyone else. After six months of working with the boys, she got him to admit that he does like them, even considering them his good luck charms. She is a main character in season 2. Although she was not a main character in the first season, she appeared in all the episodes for season one, except Big Time Break. In Big Time Girlfriends, Kelly was angry at Gustavo when she found out he hired an actress to break Carlos' heart to get him to sing about breakups, so she threatened to break Gustavo's music awards if Carlos ended up hurt. It is revealed that she has a black belt. Although she is often annoyed and disgusted by Gustavo, it is implied that she likes working for him and also favors the boys.

Secondary characters

Jo Taylor
Joanne "Jo" Taylor (Katelyn Tarver) is the first and original new girl at the Palm Woods. Jo is from North Carolina and lives in L.A. with her strict former marine, CIA dad. She is an aspiring singer and actress, although she has only sung along with the group and their friends in the episode Welcome Big Time and plays Rachel in the show "New Town High". In the episode Big Time Sneakers, it is revealed that "Rachel" is a cheerleader. Jo is best friends with Camille and gets along well with every other character. She first appeared in Big Time Love Song, where the guys were battling it out to see who would get to date her but none of them got to after she lied she had a boyfriend. Following these events, the other guys moved on and it was only Kendall who insisted on Jo to give him a chance. Though she constantly turned him down, Kendall finally figured out her lie and she started to develop feelings for him. This eventually leads to them soon becoming a couple at the Palm Woods end-of-year school dance (Big Time Dance).

In Season 2, Jo and Kendall's relationship face major difficulties. In the first episode of season 2, Welcome Back, Big Time, Kendall becomes overly jealous when he sees Jo with a good-looking guy (unaware that he is Jo's new co-star in the show "New Town High", Jett Stetson, who keeps on flirting with her on and off-screen) that leads Jo to end their relationship, though she changed her mind hours later after he left an apology on her phone and appeared in a Big Time Rush concert holding an "I <3 Kendall" sign. In the episode Big Time Girlfriends Kendall and Jo spend so little time together; due to their career demands that Kendall considers breaking up but accepts that seeing her for a minute is better than never. Later, in Big Time Sneakers, Jo's publicist tries to create a rumor that Jo and her co-star Jett are a real life couple, in order to promote the series, thus causing trouble in Kendall and Jo's relationship. But Kendall finds a way to solve their problem. Moreover, in Big Time Prom Kings their night and the chances of winning "prom king and queen" are ruined by Jo's overprotective dad. Despite this, Jo and Kendall are the longest actual dating couple at the Palm Woods and no matter their fights they always get back together.

In the episode Big Time Break-Up, Jo gets offered a part in a three-movie deal and has to leave to New Zealand for 3 years. She firstly decides to reject the chance, not wanting to lose Kendall, but he unwillingly urges her to take the once in a lifetime opportunity for her best interests, and so she leaves. In the episode, it is claimed that they are both in love and care deeply the one for another. After her departure Kendall falls into heartbreak depression, which he manages to get over with his friends and family's help. She returns in Season 3 Big Time Surprise, right after Kendall and Lucy kiss. At the end of Big Time Decision, Kendall walks through LA, and sees several things that remind him of Lucy. He goes back to the Palm Woods and chooses Jo as his girlfriend, which causes Lucy to leave the Palm Woods. In Big Time Babysitting, Kendall tries to rebuild his relationship with Jo but has to babysit Babylace, who is a rock legend, with Logan. On Babylace's advice, Kendall sets up a picnic for him and Jo but Babylace suffers one of his frequent heart attacks and faints on the picnic table. When Kendall cancels his picnic date Jo thinks he doesn't want to have a date with her and accidentally calls Jo Lucy. Jo gets upset and walks away. Later Kendall tries to sing Jo a love song that Babylace helped him write for her, but he has another heart attack and has to be revived by Logan, so Kendall doesn't get to sing to Jo. Instead Kendall asks Jo for another chance for them to start a new relationship again. Kendall and Jo go together as a couple to the Hall Of Rock Awards. As in Big Time Rescue, it is revealed, if they teach each other or doing something together, they argue. But even though this happens, they seem to get along.

Jennifer Knight
Jennifer Knight (Challen Cates) is the loving, kind, caring mother of Kendall and Katie. Usually she is mentioned as Mrs. Knight or Mama Knight and her name, Jennifer (Jen) is revealed in season two episode Big Time Moms and Big Time Movie. She is the adult responsible of Big Time Rush and the only parent to move to live with them. It is seen she gets along very well with Katie and the guys, who respect her and can count on her, as she is proven helpful and both lenient and strict when needed. Despite her gentle personality Mrs. Knight can get really stubborn at times, becoming aggressive and competitive while she can go to the extremes for something she is determined to do and as claimed she likes to win. It is also mentioned that when back to Minnesota she used to be a waitress. Overall, aside from Kendall, she is mostly seen helping and advising Logan who seeks for and respects her opinions.

Mrs. Knight befriends Mrs. Duncan in Big Time Girl Group while she marries Buddha Bob in Big Time Wedding, so as him won't have to leave the country and though their marriage is invalid, she finds out he could be a good husband. In Big Time Strike, she goes on strike from her daily duties in order Katie to appreciate her hard work and since that episode she is proven to be a really good negotiator. In Big Time Secret, she got revealed that her hair color isn't natural and that her homemade cookies are not at all homemade. Mrs. Knight was stated to be the band's "momager" during Big Time Interview.

Mrs. Knight is the only mother to appear in more than one episode (all the other boys' mothers only appeared in Big Time Moms) and is in fact the most viewed recurring character since Kelly Wainwright became a series regular. In season 3, Challen Cates gets credited for every episode even if she doesn't appear in it.

Reginald Bitters (Mr. Bitters)
Reginald Bitters (Mr. Bitters) (David Anthony Higgins) is the strict, money-loving, manager of the Palm Woods. He doesn't really like Kendall, James, Carlos and Logan or generally anything that disturbs the hotel's peace. Sometimes he is enemies with Big Time Rush and want to get them out of their building.  He is also a frenemy with Katie Knight and though they constantly get on each other nerves they seem to care the one for another and occasionally they get along well. He is never helpful at his work and can get lazy as well as arrogant and tries to impose his own rules to others no matter how unfair they may be, though he gets usually outsmarted by either Katie or the guys. He doesn't really care about other people's feelings but he is always in for a challenge as he likes to win. He is sarcastic enough giving comments throughout the series. Also it seems he set eyes for Big Time Rush's apartment (2J) after it got fixed and has already given them two of the three strikes (of false behavior) needed to evict them.

During "Big Time Moms", it was revealed that in the past, Bitters quit veterinarian school to follow his girlfriend, an aspiring actress, at the Palm Woods and after he spent his entire money supporting her acting career, she dumped him and he landed a job there. His mother arrived at the Palm Woods not knowing all that and still believing her son was a vet who was married and had a son, so Katie and Buddha Bob helped him pull all this off. At the end, Bitters's mom got convinced that her son was working in the CIA and kept it a secret for her own protection. In "Big Time Rocker", we learn that Bitters keeps his savings in a house safe which Camille, as Mila Stark, robbed. Also, in "Big Time Christmas", Mr. Bitters had been lonely and sad on Christmas claiming that he hates holidays, but Katie got him to spend the Christmas with them and showed him what Christmas is like with family and friends. In that episode it is seen that Mr. Bitters doesn't like that nobody likes him and the good side of him hiding inside got finally revealed.

Arthur Griffin
Arthur Griffin (Matt Riedy) is the CEO of conglomerate RCMCBT Global Net Sanyoid Corporation, which owns Rocque Records. He was said to be the fourth most powerful CEO in America as claimed in Big Time Photo Shoot. He tends to have irrational demands from Gustavo and Big Time Rush to be fulfilled in a short period of time that they always just barely reach. He is also known to make spur-of-the-moment decisions, such as installing a swirly-slide in his office in Big Time Crib (although there is no trace of it in Big Time Reality) and doing an unannounced corporate evaluation in Big Time Live, or even introducing a new member-replacement to the group (Big Time Bad Boy) and creating a reality show on Big Time Rush's lives (Big Time Reality) thus causing way too many trouble to the guys. On numerous occasions, he has threatened to shut down Big Time Rush or otherwise handicap it and in Big Time Concert he did cancel the band forcing them to move back to Minnesota. Griffin has also a daughter named Mercedes, who despite being spoiled and having her father's obnoxious behaviour, has a softer side as seen in Big Time Demos. Moreover, Griffin occasionally enjoys causing misery to people (he decided to fire people on Christmas Eve) and despite all his attitude he claims to "love" the boys. Gustavo also describes him as having "the creative pop sensibility of a walnut." In the episode "Big Time Songwriters," it is revealed that he is very muscular.

A running gag in the series is that whenever he talks with Gustavo, he nearly always states that whatever Gustavo is planning is no longer in style; "New research shows that the (boy band, monster band, etc., etc.) is dead!" This is usually accompanied by him tossing a large research binder at Gustavo, which Gustavo almost fails to catch.

Camille Roberts
Camille Roberts (Erin Sanders) is known as the "Method Actress Queen" of the Palm Woods and can always be seen practicing her lines around the pool before her auditions. She is somewhat insane, according to Kendall in Big Time Party. Camille is a little crazy, but she is always there for the guys and is one of their closest friends. While she has been implied to be a good actress, she herself has admitted how she had to go to 32 auditions before landing a role, probably due to her deep emotional investment into her characters and sometimes extreme measures. Every time she has had an audition for a dramatic role, she slaps Logan on the face. When she and James auditioned for a role on the fictitious "Witches of Rodeo Drive," she arrived dressed in costume, packed with props, and wired herself with explosives as part of a trick to try to land the part, which she didn't get after blowing up the casting director's office. She was in love with Logan from day one, and on the episode Big Time Love Song purposely prevented him from impressing Jo by using him in a kissing scene, pretending that she was practicing her audition for One Tree Hill. Camille is best friends with Jo. In "Big Time Party", she wanted Logan to audition for a role in her "fantasy dream movie." Logan rejected the idea at first, but came back to play in her "movie" and soon began to grow feelings for her. But soon Logan had to balance her date with Mercedes' and, after Camille discovered this, she and Mercedes threw him into the pool, then agreed to dance with him but not to talk to him for a week, showing that she was really cool. Logan acknowledging his feelings for Camille, he dressed up as a prince and rode in on a fake horse to ask her to be his date for the dance. In the movie Big Time Concert, it appeared as if the boys were leaving after Griffin dumped them. After seeing Kendall and Jo kiss good-bye, Logan asked for something to remember Camille. As he leaned in to kiss her, she slapped him. Later on, when the boys came back and had to find James, Logan accidentally blurted out "Camille" instead of James, showing he missed her during their time apart. In the episode "Big Time Girlfriends", James and Camille kissed when they caught up with the acting while practicing some lines, although James claimed that Camille is not his type earlier in "Big Time Dance". This led Logan and Camille to break up and remain good friends even though they still have feelings for each other. Logan and Camille's relationship is the biggest/most like couple of the series. But they are constantly on an unresolved on again off again relationship status as stated in Big Time Girlfriends. Despite their "break-up" Camille is constantly seen helping Logan, as well as the other boys when in trouble, proving to be a valuable friend. She lives in 4J.

In "Big Time Christmas", Camille gave Logan a present and kissed him goodbye. In "Big Time Crush", Camille and Logan date other people even though each one of them realizes that they still care for the other. In "Big Time Rocker" Camille finally landed a role in a movie,("Spy High") as secret agent Mila Stark and when in role she shared some romantic moments with Logan. Logan though seemingly liked her character more than the real her mostly because she kissed him a lot. In "Big Time Secret" Logan becomes extremely jealous and overreacts when he realizes that Camille and Kendall share a secret, assuming they are dating, though the truth is they were secretly figure skating together. Also in Big Time Move, Camille was seen during a Big Time Rush performance having a flirty interaction with Logan (pronouncing "i love you"), probably hinting that they may resume their relationship in season 3. 
In the episode "Big Time Returns". Logan and Camille get back together again.

Freight Train

Freight Train (Stephen Keys) is Gustavo's personal enforcer and bodyguard. He is huge, amazingly muscular, and able to lift all the boys up at once, but also likes the boys. A play on his name, any time he appears a train whistle is heard in the background track. According to Gustavo, he is in charge of making people do what he says. Although usually portraying an intimidating and serious personality, he has a kind and caring heart towards others including Gustavo.

Mr. X
Mr. X (Fred Tallaksen) is the dance instructor for Gustavo's bands, as well as various other music groups. He frequently uses words that start with the letter 'X', and he has choreographed for Boy-Quake and Boys in the Attic, two of Gustavo's boy bands, as well as Madonna, Beyoncé, and Yo Gabba Gabba.  He first appeared in Big Time Audition, where he tried teaching Big Time Rush how to dance. However, they ended up stressing him out, after which he "said a bunch of bad words that started with 'X'" and quit. He reappears in Big Time Dance and Big Time Concert, where he again taught them new dance moves. Also he makes a brief appearance in season two episode Big Time Girl Group choreographing Kat's Crew. He thinks they are better than BTR.

Tyler Duncan
Tyler Duncan (Tucker Albrizzi) is a red-haired, chubby kid who, because of his mom, stars in the Juice Box commercials, although he really only wants to be a normal kid. He goes to the Palm Woods School with Katie and the boys. His mother is obsessed with his acting career, and with the help of Katie and the boys he is able to hide from her. He has froggy slippers that were stolen along with Carlos's helmet, Mr. Bitter's bologna, and Buddha Bob's music box. In the episode Big Time Sparks, James tried dressing him as a leprechaun to get rid of his bad luck. He appeared in Big Time Dance with a non-speaking role. He had a major role in Big Time Girl Group, where Katie and Mrs. Knight hide him from his mother during their various attempts to find friends at the Palmwoods. In the same episode, it is revealed that he was the friend Katie was looking for and that he is from Indiana. Tyler does not have his running gag with his mom anymore.

Mrs. Duncan
Mrs. Duncan (Alyssa Preston) is Tyler's mom and she's obsessed with his acting career. She always wants to put him in commercials, and in the episode Big Time Break she tried to put him in a diaper commercial. With the help of Katie and the boys, Tyler is able to hide from her. Also, she claims for her son Tyler be "adorable". In Big Time Girl Group, she began a friendship with Katie and Mrs. Knight. She claims that she wanted the chance for a better life for her son, which is why she is so obsessed with his acting career. In the end, they come up with the plan of no auditions for Tyler until after 3 p.m., so that he can have fun time and she still has a chance at the 'big time'. Though she stated that she will continue to chase after Tyler, neither her nor her son have been seen since Big Time Girl Group.

Guitar Dude
Guitar Dude (Barnett O'Hara) is a teenage songwriter trying to make it in Hollywood and lives at the Palm Woods, home of aspiring child stars. He usually does the background music when the boys are at the pool. In Big Time Fever it was stated that he was a former cello player before he got Hollywood Fever. He also plays background in Big Time Rush's apparently Famous midnight Jams. In Big Time Terror he plays the music for one of their midnight jams.

Buddha Bob
Buddha Bob (Daran Norris) is the grounds keeper and janitor at the Palm Woods. He is a tall, lumberjack-like man who looks like he hasn't shaved in a while and despite his fierce looks is actually very nice. He soon enough befriended the whole "Big Time Rush family" (with the guys claiming to like him, such as Carlos in Big Time Break) and especially Katie Knight, each other since his first appearance in Big Time Bad Boy. He is shown to be really weird, doing unusual things such as trying to cut a jelly doughnut with an axe or showing love to his plunger, which he named Plungy. Also, he seems to be really easy-going, usually just saying "Uh, okay" whatever question someone may ask. Furthermore, Buddha Bob enjoys playing music on his boom-box (or "portable electrified music playing machine" as he calls it) with large head-phones. His boom-box was stolen once by Lightning, the TV Wonder Dog. It is also revealed that Buddha Bob is an immigrant from Canada and that he went to a business school (Big Time Fever).

Buddha Bob is seen helping, apart from the guys, Katie, Mrs. Knight, Jo and even Gustavo in Big Time Guru by making him calmer and becoming his song writing partner though they wrote a terrible song.  He somehow looks like an alternate of John Lennon in Big Time Fever with his glasses and his haircut. In Big Time Wedding, Buddha Bob marries Mrs. Knight in order not to be sent back to his country and even though Mr. Bitters who did the marriage was no longer qualified to give weddings, Mrs. Knight discovers along the way that he would be an excellent husband and that he is a great cook.

Miss Collins
Miss Collins (Tara Strong) is the teacher at the Palm Woods school. She is very nice and sweet and even has class outside once in a while. She debuted in Big Time School of Rocque. When the boys found out they were going to the School of Rocque (Parody of School of Rock) instead of the Palm Woods school, they kept dreaming up fantasies about the Palm Woods school, like having water fights for homework and eating pie and Miss Collins having class outside everyday and she being the greatest teacher in history. When Gustavo cracked and let them go to the Palm Woods school, they were very excited at first. But when they entered the room and Miss Collins said they were going to talk about water displacement, James, Kendall, and Logan started squirting water around the room and Carlos stuffed his face in pie. When they saw an annoyed Miss Collins, they realized that school was a lot more fun in their fantasies, and they got detention. She re-appears in Big Time Dance and returns for her second major appearance in Welcome Back Big Time. She then appears in Green Time Rush.

The Jennifers
The Jennifers (Denyse Tontz as Jennifer 1; Spencer Locke in the early Season 1 episodes/Kelli Goss in the later Season 1 episodes and onwards as Jennifer 2; and Savannah Jayde as Jennifer 3) are three self-absorbed girls with the same name that live and go to school at the Palm Woods who sing, dance, and act. Kendall, James, Logan, and Carlos fall for them but the girls won't date them until they become famous. In time, however, they have become more like friends to the boys as the series progresses, but Carlos still has interest in them. They actually kiss Carlos in Big Time Christmas after Carlos held a mistletoe which shows they have holiday spirit. According to Katie, they have a "lack of fear". They are all at least 16 years old. They are great actresses as shown in "Big Time Crib" when they pretended that Bitters refrigerator fell on them with "blood" (ketchup) all on them. One of the shows running gags is every time they enter a scene, they move in slow motion as if on a runway, Jennifer 2 always being in the center and the others holding her arms.  In Big Time Fever, Jennifer 2 goes off to film a soap opera in Iceland and when the other two Jennifers attempt to enter in their signature walk, they stop halfway and trip apparently because Jennifer 2 wasn't there for them to hold, pushing them to make Carlos into a Jennifer.  Camille comments that before catching the Hollywood Fever, the Jennifers moved in normal motion. In Big Time Beach Party, they once again reject Carlos, but they agree to help Kendall by pretending to date him (which failed). They also later in the special show some admiration for Carlos. In the episode Big Time Prom Kings Jennifer 1 (whose last name appeared to be Woods) was Carlos's date for the prom and revealed a clumsy side of herself as a result of her separation from the other Jennifers. Moreover, Jennifer One is told to be the most sensitive Jennifer. Jennifer Two agreed to date James for the episode Big Time Single and ruined his "never-been-dumped record" by breaking up with him minutes later, only to have him breaking her "never-been-dumped record" consequently. In Big Time Move Jennifer 3 appeared for the first time without the other Jennifers (it is the only episode that only one Jennifer appears) and while enjoying a Big Time Rush performance she gave Carlos a flirty wave, probably hinting she might have feelings for him, but quickly covered it up after realizing what she did. In Big Time Double Date, Jennifer 3 and Carlos go out on a date to which she stated was the best date ever. In Big Time Camp, Jennifer 2 kissed Carlos, and Carlos begins to date her. In Big Time Rescue, Carlos breaks up with her (with Kendall and Jo's help) because she and Carlos only do things that Jennifer likes.

Jett Stetson
Jett Stetson (David Cade) is portrayed as a cocky, self-centered actor who appears in Welcome Back, Big Time and plays a character in the television show New Town High alongside Jo. He has to kiss Jo's character. As Kendall gets suspicious about it, Katie and Bitters both tell him that Jett looks way better than he does. He has dated all his co-stars, and Kendall tries to sabotage his kiss scene with Jo to the point where it almost costs him his relationship with her. Jett does not like Kendall and often insults his looks, calling his face odd. He reappears in Big Time Sneakers, Big Time Pranks, and Big Time Christmas. Jett is interested in Jo and has tried to steal her from Kendall in his debut Welcome Back, Big Time, Big Time Sneakers and Big Time Christmas which makes him an enemy to Kendall. He seems to be a somewhat of a wimp as seen in his frightened reaction when Kendall tries to hit him in Big Time Sneakers and he claims that he bruises easily in Big Time Christmas when James, Carlos and Logan carry him off and presumably beat him up after he tried flirting with Jo in front of Kendall and then teased for not having a TV show after he gave her a much more expensive gift which Kendall responds to by sicking them on him. Since his debut and all his other appearances, Jett and Kendall have never been on good terms and Kendall has stated he can't stand Jett. He appears in Big Time Pranks on the boys' team against the girls', but fails when Bitters pushes him making him set off a whoopie cushion after Jett reveals the prank war after Bitters bribed him and put all the blame on Kendall which is just another example of the two boys bad terms. Jett appears again in Green Time Rush where he is paired off with Kendall for a social studies project, (much to both of their extreme displeasure). Kendall tries to get the project done quickly so they can be done with each other, but Jett proves to be very wasteful of resources and he pays no contribution to their project. Kendall then ties him up and gags him so he can't be wasteful and the two end up winning a week at the capital to share their idea to the governor. Unfortunately, this also meant Kendall was stuck with Jett for a whole week. This episode also showed how conceited Jett is and his arrogance is shown to exceed James'. It is obvious that he is after Jo, trying to steal her away from Kendall. At the end of Green Time Rush, when Kendall came up with the idea that allowed them to speak with the governor, Jett said to him, "You know, I think this is the beginning of a beautiful friendship," although Kendall never wanted to be friends with Jett. In Big Time Break Up, Jo left L.A., Kendall, and New Town High to shoot a movie in New Zealand; He returned in Season 3 in Big Time Double Date as Camille's date but only to make Logan jealous. In Big Time Surprise, he and Kendall seem to be on better terms and often fights with James on which of them is better looking. When Jo came back, his interest in her remained as he suggested Kendall date Lucy again so he could date Jo, but he and Kendall still seem to be on better terms as Jett helped try to stop Lucy from announcing that her hit song that made Kendall seem like a jerk was about him.

Lucy Stone

Lucille "Lucy" Stone (Malese Jow) is the new girl at the Palm Woods and secondary love interest for Kendall, first appearing in Big Time Rocker. She is a rock artist and holds a "rock" appearance and attitude. She's also smart, funny and has a sharp wit. Lucy moved into Apartment 3B, (which was a small apartment about the size of a utility closet) in which the guys often like and tend to hang out in. She lives alone. She also has recorded quite a few of her own demos. In her first appearance, Big Time Rush were paralyzed by her looks and guitar skills, while James and Carlos kept on trying to date her, though she claimed she just wanted to be friends since she'd just had a nasty breakup with her last boyfriend. She also challenged Kendall by telling him that their music was cute, catchy and danceable, but just doesn't rock, forcing him to prove her wrong, which happened when Big Time Rush blocked traffic in downtown L.A. and sang their new song Paralyzed. She was extremely impressed and ends up becoming friends with the boys and Camille. In Big Time Secret she helps Logan find out what's happening between Kendall and Camille and soon gets a bit frustrated with the boys' codes and secrets. Moreover, in Big Time Move she was seen during a Big Time Rush performance in a flirty interaction with Kendall, probably hinting she has feelings for him. In Season 3, Big Time Returns James announced his renewed interest in Lucy and begins actively pursuing her, which cause some friction between him and Kendall, who wrongly assumed he wanted to date Lucy, too. Lucy got angry when she found out about the whole dibs rules the guys came up with and to put a stop to it by calling dibs on Kendall, resulting in none of the girls at the Palm Woods talking to or looking at him. Kendall finally got James to ask Lucy on a date, but she reiterates that she isn't looking for another boyfriend. She denied that she winked at Kendall and said that there was dust in her eye while talking to James. She then undibs Kendall and walks away, but winked at Kendall again as she left. In Big Time Double Date, Lucy's parents come to visit her and think Lucy's on a violin scholarship but what they didn't know was that Lucy dyed her hair black and red and came to L.A. to be a rock star. So Lucy wore a wig and a flower dress when they came. After Kendall found out what was going on he helped Lucy lie to her parents. So Lucy's parents invited Kendall with them to go to a fancy restaurant. But when Kendall caught Lucy after being hit by a cart in the restaurant, her wig came off. Lucy's parents found out about the truth and were disappointed at Lucy but Kendall told them to be proud of her. So Kendall, James, Carlos, Logan and Lucy played the song, Cover Girl. In the end Lucy's parents let her stay in L.A. Then Lucy held Kendall's hand which Kendall didn't mind. It seems Lucy and Kendall might have feelings for each other. In the episode Big Time Surprise, Lucy's ex-boyfriend, Beau returns, looking to get back together her. But Kendall discovers he's a big cheat who starts hitting on all the girls at the Palm Woods. But Kendall, with help from James, Camille and Jett eventually expose him inn front of Lucy, who promptly dumps him again. After this, Kendall and Lucy finally share their first kiss, but are interrupted by the unexpected return of Jo. After thinking about whether to stay with Lucy or go back with Jo, he chooses to be with Jo after a walk to clear his mind and seeing several signs of Lucy in the process, causing Lucy to leave the Palm Woods. However, Lucy makes a surprise return in the Season 4 episode, Big Time Scandal, having written a song called "You Dumped Me for Her", which is supposedly about Kendall dumping her for Jo. The song becomes a monster hit and caused a scandal for the band, since if she revealed the song was about Kendall, she would be "swifting" the whole band. Kendall and Jo visit Lucy at the set of her new music video and ask her not to reveal the song is about him. Not wanting to cause trouble for the band, she agrees, but changes her mind after Kendall starts listing all the ways the song is inaccurate. Angered, she tells Kendall and Jo she's going to call a press conference and tell the world the song is about him. Later, Kendall, Jo, Camille, Jett and Buddha Bob crash the press conference and try to stop Lucy from swifting Kendall, but Lucy recognizes Buddha Bob and he accidentally blows their cover. Just as Lucy is about to make her announcement, Carlos, Logan and James (in disguise) speak on Kendall's behalf. Moved by their words, she announced that the guy in her song was not Kendall, but a combination of guys she'd gone out with. She goes on to say she had one kiss and half a date with Kendall and that it was very sweet. She tells the audience (but mostly to the guys and Jo) that it was great seeing them again and thanks them for coming. As Lucy walks off stage, she sees Kendall and Jo in the audience silently thanking her and she winks at him. The guys and Jo finish the day with a happy ending until they figure out Lucy is moving back in. In the next episode, Big Time Lies, with Lucy back at the Palm Woods, drama begins to unfold when Lucy starts to flirt with Kendall. To avoid problems with Jo, Kendall decides to keep it a secret that Lucy is talking to him again. Kendall continues to lie to Jo, usually resulting in his pants bursting into flames, but then later Kendall confesses to Jo, due to assistance from Ms. Knight, and Lucy admits she is not really interested in Kendall again, as she is only doing it to start drama as a songwriting technique, which leads her and Jo to become friends. Sometime later in the fourth season, Lucy begins to see a different side of James and gains feelings for him, though she goes on tour before she can confess them. In Big Time Dreams, she gets into an argument with James about leaving without saying goodbye. During the award for best kiss, it's revealed that she truly does like James and came back because of him, which leads to them finally sharing their first kiss and becoming a couple.

Hawk
Cyrys Z. Hawk (Phil LaMarr) is Gustavo's arch-rival and owner of Hawk Records, as well as the main villain in the first season. He appears in the episode Big Time Sparks, where he is determined to drag Jordin Sparks, who makes a special guest appearance, away from "Rocque Records" and to that end, sends Gustavo a package with a live skunk in it in order to ruin the studio and convincing Jordin to record her new single with him instead. Fortunately, the boys manage to catch it, saving both Kelly and Gustavo, who comes up with a brilliant plan to get back at him. He assigned Jordin to pretend she wants to go to "Hawk Records" to record her song after all, but when Hawk gets into his limo, he gets sprayed in the face by the same skunk he delivered to Gustavo, and runs off screaming. He makes his second appearance in "Big Time Concert", where he is determined to destroy the boys career to the point of kidnapping them to keep them from showing up at their first concert. He has an assistant named Rebecca, who gathers intel on the boys for him and helps them kidnap them near the end of the episode. Hawk is released from prison in the episode "Big Time Superheroes" after doing time for the incidents in "Big Time Concert", but there is no mention of what became of Rebecca. He apparently went insane during his time in prison, taking to dressing up as a hawk-like super villain and tried to take revenge on Big Time Rush by stealing the hard-drive that contained all the songs of their second album on it and releasing it under his label. He is arrested once again when the boys expose him to the LAPD. He has not made any appearances in seasons three and four since his arrest.

Lightning The TV Wonder Dog

Lightning The TV Wonder Dog (Morgan the dog) is a celebrity dog that lives in the Palmwoods. He has appeared in many episodes as a background character. In the Halloween special - Big Time Halloween, he steals Logan's arm and Logan chases after him.

Dr. Hollywood

Dr. Hollywood (Lorenzo Lamas) is the Palm Woods doctor. He is dramatic and appears in many episodes. Logan loves helping the doc out.

Minor characters

Obdul
Obdul (Obdul Reid) is Griffin's personal bodyguard and assistant. He is always wearing a business suit and carries a black leather briefcase at all times. A running gag is Griffin saying something assaulting and Obdul tapping his briefcase. Another running gag is the always different content of the briefcase. Obdul often inspires fear in the other characters. However, he is shown to have a soft side, as when he helped Gustavo and Katie in Green Time Rush. Also this is the first episode in which he has a speaking part. Another episode where he takes an active role is Big Time Pranks II.

Joanna Mitchell 
Joanna Mitchell (Holly Wortell) is Logan Mitchell's mom who appeared in Big Time Moms. She wants everything cleaned up. She is a real estate agent, and she used her job to help convince James's mom to let him stay in L.A. by finding a place for her to open up an office on the West Coast, thus allowing her to see her son at least once a month.

Sylvia Garcia 
Sylvia Garcia (Jill-Michele Melean) is Carlos Garcia's mother who appeared in Big Time Moms. Her specialty is healthy diets. She works as an IT systems analyst, and she used her job to convince James's mom to let him stay in L.A. by setting up the boys' apartment with a T1 line and by setting up the computers with Facetalk, thus allowing Brooke to see James virtually whenever she wanted.

Officer Garcia
Mr. Garcia (Erik Estrada) is Carlos father who appears in the episode Big Time Break. According to Carlos, he goes overboard with his job as a policeman. Specifically, he can be extremely fierce and overprotective when someone messes with his son. According to himself, he has taken sensitivity training nine times. He helps Carlos find his helmet, when it was stolen by "Lighting, The TV wonder dog". He and Sylvia are married.

Sasha
Natasha "Sasha" (Chelsea Ricketts) is Carlos's girlfriend hired by Gustavo to pretend to like Carlos so when they "break up" his heart will be broken and can relate and sing the love song better.

Brooke Diamond
Brooke Diamond (Lisa Rinna) is James Diamond's mom who appears in Big Time Moms. She wants to take James home so he could become the future CEO of her cosmetics company. It is revealed she misses him so much that Carlos's, Logan's and Kendall's mothers set up ways for her to still see James and keep in touch with him. She is divorced from her husband who married a woman 15 years younger. She is the Estée Lauder of the Midwest. According to Carlos, she is "part powerful, part beautiful and all terrifying."

Marcos Del Posey
Marcos (Carlos Alazraqui) is the Italian #1 teen photographer in the world, according to Gustavo. He appears in "Big Time Photo Shoot" where he takes their first photo. It was all good at first, until Griffin ruined a simple shot with the theme of "Space Matadors". However, the boys somehow got rid of him and Gustavo took the photo. He re-appears in Big Time Video, where he is determined to become the director of their upcoming music video "The City Is Ours". He eventually gets the part and is praised by Gustavo. It is unknown if he will be seen again.

Jenny Tinkler
Jennifer "Jenny" Tinkler (Sammy Jay Wren) is the boy's clumsy hometown friend from high school in Minnesota. She makes a brief appearance in Big Time Audition, angry at Gustavo for scolding her audition while being held and thrown out by security. She return to makes her major appearance in Big Time Fans. She is accident-prone, based on events that happened, such as causing three fires and an explosion at the Palm Woods. She is despised by Mr. Bitters for her actions, and was banned at the Palm Woods for life as a result. She came to LA because Carlos signed an autograph promising to make her dream come true. She took that seriously. At the end, she made her dream by joining a band called Death Smash, as a replacement for Johnny, who they hated. Jenny is shown to always be happy no matter what the trouble is. She will most likely return but for now that is unknown.

Fujisaki
Fujisaki (Koji Kataoka) is the head owner of the "RCM CBT Global Net Sanyoid" company. He appears in "Big Time Crib" and makes an appearance in "Big Time Party". He appeared in Season 1 a few times but never in Seasons 2–4.
he was born in the 1940s

Stephanie King
Stephanie (Tristin Mays) is the third "new girl" at the "Palm Woods" who the boys liked in the episode Big Time Terror and was later discovered to be the Palm Woods ghost. She helped the boys get rid of Gustavo from their apartment in exchange for them keeping her low-budget horror movie a secret from Mr. Bitters and her father. Stephanie befriended Katie (whom she taught how to scare people using only a fishing line in Big Time Terror) as well as Camille and Jo (in Big Time Dance). She seems to show affection towards the boys and especially Carlos, referring to them as "cute and hot" in Big Time Terror, whereas in Big Time Dance she asked Carlos to the dance after the Jennifers got in a fight over him. She has only appeared in two episodes and has not been seen since Big Time Dance, even though she seemed to attend the Palm Woods school. Her name and personality are allusions to the famous horror writer Stephen King. Both Carlos and Stephanie had feelings for each other.

Kyle
Kyle (Jerry Phillips) is Katie's crush who appeared in Big Time Crush. In the episode, he went on a date with Katie to originally see Kiss and Tell, but ended up staying in the arcade due to Kyle grossed out seeing people kissing. He never appeared again.

Atticus Moon
Sir Atticus Moon (Trevor Devall) is a Bond type villain and famous billionaire, who owns various businesses across Britain and possibly the world. He believes all the worlds problems stem from its leaders and their disagreements and thus plots to take over the world using a gravity defying device called "The Beetle" to shift the moon out of orbit causing natural disasters to strong arm world leaders into giving into his demands. The Beetle was stolen by Rogue British spy, Simon Lane who switches it into Kendall's bag. Shortly later Simon is kidnapped and the boys find out about the beetle. The boys team up with Simon's daughter Penny to save Simon from Moon, but the negotiation goes wrong. The boys agree to help hunt Moon down to clear Simon's name, but Moon has Katie abducted. That night the boys and Penny race to Moon's mansion and fight his guards as Moon initiates his plan. The boys thwart the plan but Moon immediately takes Katie hostage again demanding they give him The Beetle. Kendall reluctantly tosses the Beetle to him and Katie steps on his foot, causing the beetle to latch onto his jacket, causing Moon to float away into the air. It is unknown if it released him but given the circumstances, Moon may be deceased.

Penny Lane
Penelope "Penny" Lane (Emma Lahana) is Simon Lane's daughter who was a trained spy by her father. In Big Time Movie, when her father goes rogue, she sets out to find a device called "The Beetle" that ended up in Kendall's possession. She breaks into their room to steal the device back, and after realizing they are now wanted by the British government, the boys later teams up with the Penny into saving her abducted father in exchange for The Beetle, but the negotiation goes wrong and they end up thinking of a plan to take Moon down, but Simon is tranquilized and they end up having to do so themselves. Later, when Katie is abducted, Penny and the boy's rush to Moon's mansion fighting their way through. When Moon is defeated, Simon's name is cleared and they clear the boys names. James had a crush on her. Penny's name is a parody of The Beatles song Penny Lane.

Simon Lane
A secret British agent who realized the evil plans of Sir Atticus Moon and went rogue to disrupt him. He steals an anti-gravity device known as "The Beetle" and carries it in a rather girlish bag and switches it with Kendall's equally girlish bag (a gift from a fan) and is abducted by Moon's henchmen. The boys team up with Simon's daughter Penny to rescue him, but the deal goes wrong. Simon notes that the boys are now public enemy because they were caught with the Beetle in their possession, so Simon promises to have the boys' names cleared if they help him deal with Moon, but Simon ends up getting tranquilized by Logan's mistake. He remains unconscious until the boys defeat Moon and Simon makes good on his promise. Simon's wife isn't seen in the movie.

Notable guest stars

Snoop Dogg

Snoop Dogg made his Guest Appearance in the movie Big Time Christmas. He is shown first hitting Gustavo with a limo going to his Grandma's House. The boys need two celebrity duet for Griffin and they have already done one with Miranda Cosgrove so Snoop Dogg does the 12 Day of Christmas Snoop Gave to Me but Justin Bieber had released the 50 days of Christmas so they had 5 min to write a song because Snoop needed to get to his Grandma's House eventually they get a squirrel song in five min and they record it with Snoop. After that Snoop is not seen on the TV Show again but at the Kids Choice Awards 2011 performing with BTR singing Boyfriend.

Miranda Cosgrove

Miranda Cosgrove just like Snoop, she made her guest appearance in the episode of Big Time Christmas where They needed two celebrity duets and after they saw Miranda on the TV, found out she was in L.A. doing her Christmas show "Have Yourself a Miranda Little Christmas" and singing with Fabio, the boys had countless attempts to get in after saving their security guard from choking, he lets them in and soon enough, they kidnapped Fabio and accidentally took him to Miranda's dressing room. She finds the boys with Fabio and after that, Miranda's manager said to get the boys to jail but Miranda disagrees. In the end, the boys showed that they can sing; Miranda and Fabio agreed and in the end, they performed "All I Want For Christmas Is You". Miranda Cosgrove is not seen again after the performance where James flirts with her but is taken away. Miranda is known for her former roles as Megan from Drake & Josh and Carly Shay from the show iCarly. This is also the second time James Maslow and Miranda have worked together, James' first Television appearance was on 2008 at the show iCarly in the episode iSaw Him First where he played as Shane, Freddie's (Nathan Kress) hot friend.

Elizabeth Gillies

Heather Fox, portrayed by Elizabeth Gillies, made her guest appearance in Big Time Secret where she is a famous model who went to a camp with Carlos Garcia (Carlos Pena Jr.) and James Diamond (James Maslow). Carlos had a huge crush on Heather who also turned out to like him and tells James to give him a note that said she liked him but he does not because he is in love with her too. James told Carlos about this years later but now Carlos claims that James broke a friendship code and to fix it, James recreates the camp so that Heather and Carlos can re-live their old camp days. Heather, instead of falling for Carlos, fell in love with James and tells Carlos to give him a note that said she liked him. Carlos decides to give it to James but, James declined and said that their friendship is more important. Her role in this episode where she is very nice and sweet is very different from her former main role in Victorious where she is known as Jade West who is much more cold-hearted, unkind and careless and also has an obnoxious personality.

Jordin Sparks

Jordin Sparks make her guest appearance in Big Time Sparks where she is recording a song at Rocque Records (her brother PJ also makes an appearance at the end of the episode). She can't feel the song though during this episode. Mr. Bitters is trying to get embarrassing pictures of her to get rich. Gustavo tell the boys to stay away from Jordin calling them Bad Luck Rush. Later Kendall saves Jordin and Jo see them together and thinks they are in love. Also James break his mirror getting bad luck looking for a four leaf clover. Carlos and Logan see all this bad luck and they want to protect Jordin. Kendall makes a girly lunch for Jo but Jordin is saved by Kendall again. Jo once again see this and walks away angrily. Later Jordin is pushed down a well after all the boys get in the well after many attempts to get they figure out the song and call Freight Train there is also a skunk who Gustavo and Kelly are getting rid of. The boys catch the skunk. Jordin says she wants a duet with BTR they do a duet and then they trick Hawk. Kelly points out many good things about the boys that has happened to Gustavo such as recording the song with Jordin. The song was "count on me". He admits they are his good luck charm but only tells Kelly he says if he tells the boys they will mess it up. Jordin is very sweet and thinks the Palm Woods is lucky. She was mentioned in "Big Time Christmas".

Chris Masters

Chris Masters made his guest appearance in Big Time School of Rocque being one of the teachers hired to discipline the boys and forces the boys to do grueling jobs as he is very muscular and fit but eventually is driven out quickly by the boys. He is known for being a former WWE wrestler where he has been called the hottie with a body.

Fabio

Fabio Lanzoni first appeared in Big Time Dance, where Mrs. Knight would only go out with Fabio on a dance and Katie convinces Fabio to go to the dance with her Mom. He reappears in Big Time Christmas on a Christmas special with Miranda Cosgrove but he agrees that he isn't really a singer and that Miranda should rather record a song with BTR. He also appears in Bel Air Rush where he too lives in Bel Air. Katie picks lemons from his lemon tree to make lemonade with and sell which Fabio tries to stop. Katie then throws one of the lemons into the garden with the tiger and Fabio gets mauled by the tiger while trying to retrieve the lemon. In the end, while BTR is escaping from Bel Air, Fabio too begs them to take him with them due to being unhappy with being mauled by the tiger and they agree.

References

Lists of American sitcom television characters
Characters